Fate in Seven Lessons is an EP by American darkwave band Cold Cave, released on June 11, 2021 through Heartworm Press.

Track listing

References

External links 

2021 albums
Cold Cave albums
Self-released albums